The Men's road race C4-5 cycling event at the 2012 Summer Paralympics took place on September 6 at Brands Hatch. Thirty-one riders from twenty-three nations competed. The race distance was 80 km.

Results
DNF = Did Not Finish

Source:

References

Men's road race C4-5